Ireland competed at the 2016 Summer Paralympics in Rio de Janeiro, Brazil, from 7 to 18 September 2016.

Funding 
Some international support for participation fell through at the last minute, resulting in severe cut back to the 2016 Summer Paralympics. This was in part a result of only  220,000 of the 2.5 million tickets to watch the Games in Rio being sold a month ahead of the Games.  The Irish Paralympic Committee's CEO Liam Harbison told the Wall Street Journal that these cuts could have a catastrophic consequence for Paralympic athletes.

Medallists

| width="78%" align="left" valign="top" |

| width="22%" align="left" valign="top" |

Disability classifications

Every participant at the Paralympics has their disability grouped into one of five disability categories; amputation, the condition may be congenital or sustained through injury or illness; cerebral palsy; wheelchair athletes, there is often overlap between this and other categories; visual impairment, including blindness; Les autres, any physical disability that does not fall strictly under one of the other categories, for example dwarfism or multiple sclerosis. Each Paralympic sport then has its own classifications, dependent upon the specific physical demands of competition. Events are given a code, made of numbers and letters, describing the type of event and classification of the athletes competing. Some sports, such as athletics, divide athletes by both the category and severity of their disabilities, other sports, for example swimming, group competitors from different categories together, the only separation being based on the severity of the disability.

Cycling 

With one pathway for qualification being one highest ranked NPCs on the UCI Para-Cycling male and female Nations Ranking Lists on 31 December 2014, Ireland qualified for the 2016 Summer Paralympics in Rio, assuming they continued to meet all other eligibility requirements.

Equestrian 
The country earned an individual slot via the Para Equestrian Individual Ranking List Allocation method.

Football 7-a-side football 

Ireland national 7-a-side football team qualified for the Rio Paralympics at 2015 World Championships because of their sixth-place finish.

The draw for the tournament was held on May 6 at the  2016 Pre Paralympic Tournament in Salou, Spain.  Ireland was put into Group A with Ukraine, Great Britain and Brazil. The tournament where the draw took place featured 7 of the 8 teams participating in Rio.  It was the last major preparation event ahead of the Rio Games for all teams participating.  Ireland finished 5th after winning both their placement matches to the United States 4 - 3 and Argentina 0 - 3.   Their roster for this tournament included Brian McGillivary, Joe Markey, Darragh Snell, Luke Evans, Eric O'Flaherty, Paraic Leacy, Gary Messett, Carl McKee, Aaron Tier, Dillon Sheridan, Tomiwa Badun, Ryan Nolan, Simon L'Estrange and Conor Tuite.

Going into the Rio Games, the country was ranked fifth in the world.

Sailing

One pathway for qualifying for Rio involved having a boat have top seven finish at the 2015 Combined World Championships in a medal event where the country had nor already qualified through via the 2014 IFDS Sailing World Championships.  Ireland qualified for the 2016 Games under this criteria in the Sonar event with a ninth-place finish overall and the fourth country who had not qualified via the 2014 Championships.

Shooting

The country sent shooters to 2015 IPC IPC Shooting World Cup in Osijek, Croatia, where Rio direct qualification was available.  They earned a qualifying spot at this event based on the performance of Sean Baldwin in the R7 – 50m Rifle 3 Positions Men SH1 event.

See also
Ireland at the 2016 Summer Olympics

References

2016 in Irish sport
2016
Nations at the 2016 Summer Paralympics